The 1906–07 season was Stoke's 18th season in the Football League.

After flirting with relegation for quite a while Stoke's luck run out in 1906–07 as they were relegated, finishing bottom of the First Division with 26 points five away from safety. It was a bad season for Stoke and would be the start of a troubled period for the club.

Season review

League
After a good 1905–06 season, the 1906–07 campaign ended in tears and sorrow for Stoke supporters, as the team finished bottom of the First Division and were relegated for the first time. They dropped to the foot of the table early in the new year and stayed there winning just 4 of the last 16 fixtures. Finance was bad and Fred Rouse left for Everton in a £600 deal in November much to the annoyance of the fans. Defence was a problem for Horace Austerberry and he used 28 players including 4 amateurs. Stoke scored just 41 goals in 38 matches and there was hardly a bright spot throughout the season and Stoke entered the Football League Second Division for the first time.

FA Cup
Stoke's poor league form was not helped by three matches against West Bromwich Albion after drawing 1–1 and 2–2 West Brom won 2–0 in the second replay at Villa Park.

Final league table

Results
Stoke's score comes first

Legend

Football League First Division

FA Cup

Squad statistics

References

Stoke City F.C. seasons
Stoke